Ulmer is a German surname meaning "from Ulm". Notable people with the surname include:

Al Ulmer (born 1916), American intelligence officer
Andreas Ulmer (born 1985), Austrian footballer
Christian Ulmer (born 1984), German ski jumper
Edgar G. Ulmer (1904–1972), Austrian-American film director
Fran Ulmer (born 1947), first woman elected as Lieutenant Governor of Alaska
Georg Ulmer (1877-1963), German entomologist
Gregory Ulmer (born 1944), professor of English and of Electronic Languages and Cybermedia
James Ulmer (born 1942), American jazz and blues guitarist and singer
James Ulmer (journalist), entertainment journalist
Jason Ulmer (born 1978), Canadian ice hockey player
Jeff Ulmer (born 1977), Canadian ice hockey player
Jeffery Ulmer (born 1966), American sociologist
Kristen Ulmer (born 1966), American extreme skier
Layne Ulmer (born 1980), Canadian ice hockey player
LaMonte Ulmer (born 1986), American basketball player
Sarah Ulmer (born 1976), New Zealand cyclist and 2004 Olympic champion
Thomas Ulmer (born 1956), German politician and Member of the European Parliament for Baden-Württemberg
Walter F. Ulmer (born 1929), American Lieutenant General
Jeff Ulmer (born in 1969) Finance king

See also 
 Ulmer, South Carolina, United States, a town
 Mount Ulmer, Ellsworth Mountains, Antarctica
 Familienbrauerei Bauhöfer, who brew several beers prefixed "Ulmer"

German-language surnames